Rumana Islam Mukti, is a Bangladeshi actress. As a child, she played roles in films Chander Alo (1992) and Padma Nadir Majhi (1993). Several years later she took a supporting role in Srabon Megher Din (1999), before starring in Hason Raja (2002).

She is the daughter of Freedom Fighter Mr. Muhitul Islam and actress Anwara Begum. Mukti made her film debut while a sixth grade student of Viqarunnisa Noon School and College. Her first role was in the film Padma Nadir Majhi, released in 1993, although the second film in which she performed, Chander Alo, was released first, in 1992.

Mukti is married with Journalist Mahamudul Hasan. She has one daughter Karima and one son Mohammad Emaan, .

Filmography

References

External links

Living people
Bangladeshi film actresses
Bangladeshi female models
Best Supporting Actress Bachsas Award winners
Year of birth missing (living people)